Fédération Ivoirienne de Rugby is the governing body for rugby union in the Ivory Coast. It was founded in 1961 and became affiliated to the International Rugby Board in 1988.

References

Cot
Rugby union in Ivory Coast
Ivory Coast
Sports organizations established in 1961